A penumbral lunar eclipse took place on Thursday, June 27, 1991, the second of four lunar eclipses in 1991. The moon entered the Earth's penumbra for about 3 hours, and was difficult to see. This lunar eclipse is the predecessor of the Solar eclipse of July 11, 1991.

Visibility

Related eclipses

Eclipses of 1991 
 An annular solar eclipse on January 15.
 A penumbral lunar eclipse on January 30.
 A penumbral lunar eclipse on June 27.
 A total solar eclipse on July 11.
 A penumbral lunar eclipse on July 26.
 A partial lunar eclipse on December 21.

Saros series 

This eclipse is a member of Saros series 110. The previous event occurred on June 15, 1973. The next event was on July 7, 2009.

Lunar year series

Metonic series

Half-Saros cycle
A lunar eclipse will be preceded and followed by solar eclipses by 9 years and 5.5 days (a half saros). This lunar eclipse is related to two partial solar eclipses of Solar Saros 117.

See also 
List of lunar eclipses
List of 20th-century lunar eclipses

References

External links 
 Saros cycle 110
 

1991-06
1991 in science
June 1991 events